Laish may refer to:

Dan (ancient city), formerly known as Laish
Laish (father of Palti), the father of Palti in the Books of Samuel
Laish, Uzbekistan
Laish (band)
Noam Laish (born 1993), Israeli basketball player